The 1984 Gael Linn Cup, the most important representative competition for elite level participants in the women's team field sport of camogie, was won by Leinster, who defeated Connacht in the final, played at Silver Park Kilmacud.

Arrangements
Connacht defeated Ulster in the semi-final by 3–6 to 1–3. Leinster defeated Munster 2–1 to 1–3 in the rain at Adare then Carmel O'Byrne scored 3–2 to help Leinster defeat Connacht by 3–9 to 1–4 at Silver Park.

Gael Linn Trophy
In the trophy Leinster defeated Munster 2–4 to 1–6 at Adare, Ulster defeated Connacht, 4–6 to 1–6, at Castledaly and Leinster defeated Ulster 3–6 to 1–3 in the final.

Final stages

|}

Junior Final

|}

References

External links
 Camogie Association

1984 in camogie
1984
Cam